Burn is the ninth album by singer Melba Moore, released in 1979.

Track listing
"Burn" (Melba Moore, Pete Bellotte)
"Hot and Tasty" (Bruce Hawes, Melba Moore, Mikki Farrow)
"If You Believe in Love" (Melba Moore, Pete Bellotte)
"Night People" (Bruce Hawes, Melba Moore, Mikki Farrow)
"I Don't Wanna Lose Your Love" (Bruce Hawes, Melba Moore, Mikki Farrow)
"Can't Give it Up" (Bruce Hawes, Melba Moore, Mikki Farrow)
"Miss Thing" (Bruce Hawes, Melba Moore, Mikki Farrow)
"Need Love" (Bruce Hawes, Melba Moore, Mikki Farrow)

References

1979 albums
Melba Moore albums
Epic Records albums